The Bills were a youth subculture active in Léopoldville (modern-day Kinshasa, capital of the Democratic Republic of the Congo) in the late 1950s, basing much of their image and outlook on the cowboys of American Western movies. Its name was taken from Buffalo Bill.

Background
Bills were gangs of teenagers that dressed in cowboy outfits and went against the prevailing political views of the time. They wore cowboy hats that were brown and had cowboy boots. From 1957 to 1959, half a dozen movie theaters opened in the "African" neighborhoods in Léopoldville (the city was segregated into African and European areas). The majority of Léopoldville's population was under 20, and most of these youths were educated to only primary level, since the colonial government reserved most of the secondary school places for Europeans. Poor education resulted in large scale unemployment, and, with little else to do, the youths began to make the theaters their meeting points. They were particularly drawn to Western movies, and "Billism" began to incorporate many of the motifs into their lives. The portrayal of Buffalo Bill in the movies was especially appealing partly because of the similarity to hunter heroes of Congolese culture. The character of Buffalo Bill had already appeared in over 20 films by that time, but the most influential movie is thought to be Pony Express, where Charlton Heston played Bill.

Way of life
The Bills dressed in cowboy outfits (kerchiefs, jeans and shirts) sold in Kinshasa. The names of the 'territories' for each gang echoed those of the Western United States (Texas, Santa Fe), and the gangs themselves were usually named after their territories (such as the "Texas Bills"), but occasionally strayed outside the Western United States pantheon (such as "Godzilla"). Some commentators have suggested they provided a street-level counterpart to the more refined and overtly political anti-colonial struggle that was then being fought by some of the évolués (the middle class educated elite).

Hindoubill
The Bills developed their own argot called Hindoubill (or Hindubill). The origins of this name are obscure, but may relate to either the Hindi films occasionally shown in Kinshasa, or to the Bills conflating the Native American "Indians" of "Cowboys and Indians" with the Indians of India (à la Columbus' mistake).

References

De Boeck, Filip & Plissart, Marie-Françoise. (2004) Kinshasa: Tales of the Invisible City Ludion.  . Photography and analysis of everyday life in Kinshasa, together with extensive quotations from contemporary Congolese. The last chapter is available as a PDF here
Stewart, Gary. (2000) Rumba on the River: A history of the popular music of the two Congos Verso.  . Tells the story of Congolese music, history, and popular culture.
 Didier Gondola. (2016) Tropical Cowboys: Westerns, Violence, and Masculinity in Kinshasa Indiana University Press. . A history of the Bills and the youth groups that followed in their footsteps.

Democratic Republic of the Congo culture
History of subcultures